Bibi Ballandi (26 June 1946 – 15 February 2018) was an Italian television producer.

He worked as a manager for numerous artists, including singers such as Al Bano, Mina, Little Tony, Rita Pavone, Orietta Berti, Nicola Di Bari and Caterina Caselli in the 1960s, and later worked with Fabrizio De Andrè, Lucio Dalla, Francesco De Gregori and Roberto Vecchioni.

In 1983 he founded the "Bandiera Gialla" nightclub in Rimini.
Then, he became a television producer and started a collaboration with RAI. He produced such television programs as Ballando con le Stelle and Ti lascio una canzone.

Death
He died on 15 February 2018 in Imola, Italy, aged 71, following a long battle with colorectal cancer.

References

1946 births
2018 deaths
Deaths from cancer in Emilia-Romagna
Deaths from colorectal cancer
Italian television producers
People from the Province of Bologna